Cəhri (also, Jahri, Dzhagry, and Dzhakhri) is one of the largest village and municipality in the Babek District of Nakhchivan, Azerbaijan. It is located 23 km in the north from the district center, on the bank of the Jahrichay River, on the foothill area. Its population is busy with grain growing, vegetable-growing and animal husbandry. There are two secondary schools, two kindergartens, five libraries, three mosques, children's music school, club and a hospital in the village. It has a population of 8,454. The settlement of the İşıqlar of the Middle Ages has been recorded in north-east of the village of Jahri.

History
The existed life from the early centuries, in the settlements where located in the territory of the village and so far the remained the ruins of the settlements of the Ishyqlar, Kandtapa, Uzuntapa, Goshatapa, Garajalar, Ayriarch, shows the ancient history of the village of the Jahri. During the reign of the Arshakuni dynasty, Jahuk was the central settlement of the 14th province of Syunik province of Greater Armenia. Later, Jahuk came under the rule of Orbelian Princes. After the Orbelians, it passed to the Proshyan princes.

According to legend, because of the foreign attacks in the Middle Ages, the settlement of the İşıqlar (Ishyqlar) has been destroyed  and part of its population settled in the Jahri village, and the rest of them moved to the Sisian region of Armenia and built the same named settlement (İşıqlar). There are ancient quarters of the Jilovkhanly and the Salahly at the present Jahri. In the cemetery, located in the east side of the village have the statues of the stone ram of the medieval ages. The population living in this area since ancient times belong to the “Yurdchu” tribe, one of the arms of the Turkic Kangars (Kengerli) tribe. There has been the settlement of city-sized in the territory of Jahri village.
In the book "Jahrichay Valley" of the Haji Qadir Gadirzadeh the Corresponding Member of Azerbaijan National Academy of Sciences, has interesting information on Jahri. From the research of scientist is known that the Jahri and Jahrichay valley, are one of the oldest settlements in the Nakhchivan region. Here, was the one of the places which people had sedentary lifestyle, place of the ancient craftsmanship and trade where passed great caravan routes. In this strategical importance region were built great defense castles, and has existed the castle cities. In the ancient city of Jahri, the art of well-sinking has ancient history. In the past, Jahri was developed considerably in terms of craftsmanship. The Qash shrine of Jahri is very famous. Known as sanctuary an Esfandiar Zawiya (shrine) in the sources and among the people, is located in the west of the Jahry village, in the slope of the mountain range named “Qaş”. This Sufi center, located in the mountainous area, about 2 kilometers in the west side from the Jahri village, is known since the Middle Ages.

Demographics
According to the "Code of Statistical Data on the Population of the Transcaucasian Territory" for 1893, the village counted 1101 Armenians and 2018 Tatars.

Historical and archaeological monuments

İşıqlar
İşıqlar - the medieval settlement in the north-east of the Jahri village of Babek rayon. It is located in a favorable position in natural aspect. Its area is 46000 m2. Thickness of the cultural layer formed in result of the natural erosion is 3–5 meters. A large part of the place of residence (approximately 16,000 m2) is covered with piles of ashes; inside it are found the fragments of clay pots that seem it is associated with the activity of pottery. The founded materials is divided into two period; the fragments of the burned clay pot in the gray, black, pink colored belongs to the early Middle Ages, and mainly, the burned potteries in the pink colored decorated with geometric and floral ornaments to the advanced stage of the Middle Ages. Necropolis of the Muslim graves of the settlement has been in the south, on a small hill. Most of the graves are destroyed. In the center of the area, there is a spring called "Khartakli spring". The traces of ancient irrigation system which were used till recently, still remained.

Kəndtəpə
Kəndtəpə - the medieval settlement in the west from the Jahri village of Babek rayon. Its area is more than 10 hectares. The rest of the archaeological monument lays towards to the north-west in the form of a hill. There was water line built with clay pipes in the area. There is the soil mound (ancient artificial hill) in the north from the settlement. Significant archaeological material, especially the rich ceramic products were collected from the area.

Armenian churches
There were 3 churches in the village. St. Shoghakat Monastery of Jahuk was built in 1325-1330. It was located in the central district of the village. It was completely destroyed in 1982. Surb Astvatsatsin Church was built in the 13th century. As of the 1990s, it has been demolished. St. Hovhannes Church have frescoes dating back to the XVIII-XIX centuries. The church was renovated in the Middle ages. St. Hovhannes Church was destroyed at some point between 1997 and 2009.

Notable Natives
 Stepan Sapah-Gulian - Armenian journalist, political scientist, intellectual and a leader of the Social Democrat Hunchakian Party.
 Jean Althen (Hovhannès Althounian) - Armenian agronomist who developed the cultivation of madder in France.
 Gaik Ovakimian - Major General, USSR.
 Lazar I of Armenia - Catholicos of the Armenian Apostolic Church between 1737 and 1751.
 Rosy Armen - French-Armenian singer
 Qəzənfər Əkbərov — Hero of the Soviet Union.
 Həsən Şirinov — Deputy Chief of the Police Department of Baku, Major General of Police.
 Siyavuş Novruzov — Deputy Executive Secretary of the Party "Yeni Azərbaycan". 
 Eldar İbrahimov — Deputy of the Azerbaijan Parliament.

See also 
St. Hovhannes Church (Jahri)

References 

Populated places in Babek District
Babek District
Erivan Governorate